The Nickelodeon Netherlands Kids' Choice Awards in the Netherlands were broadcast on Nickelodeon in the Netherlands and the Flanders region of Belgium in 2004, 2005, 2007 and 2008.

Winners

2007

References

External links 
 Officiële website Nederlandse Kids Choice Awards 

Awards established in 2004
Awards disestablished in 2007
Nickelodeon Kids' Choice Awards
Dutch children's television series
2004 establishments in Belgium
2004 establishments in the Netherlands